Kalateh-ye Mirza (also Romanized as Kalāteh-ye Mīrzā; also known as Kalāt-e Mīrzā) is a village in Darmian Rural District, in the Central District of Darmian County, South Khorasan Province, Iran. At the 2006 census, its population was 44, in 11 families.

References 

Populated places in Darmian County